Hussein al-Husseini may refer to:
Hussein el-Husseini (born 1937), Lebanese politician
Hussein al-Husayni (died 1918), Arab mayor of Jerusalem